The 1990 United States Senate election in Michigan was held on November 5, 1990. Incumbent Democratic U.S. Senator Carl Levin won re-election to a third term against future Michigan Attorney General Bill Schuette.

Candidates

Democratic 
 Carl Levin, incumbent U.S. Senator

Republican 
 Bill Schuette,  U.S. Representative
 Clark Durant, attorney and founder of Cornerstone Schools

Workers World 
 Susan Farquhar

Results

See also 
 1990 United States Senate elections

References 

Michigan
1990
1990 Michigan elections